California's 36th State Assembly district is one of 80 California State Assembly districts. It is currently represented by Republican Tom Lackey of Palmdale. Despite California's six-year term limit on the State Assembly, during the 20-year period from 1992–2012, the seat was held continuously by members of either the Knight family of Palmdale or the Runner family of Lancaster.

District profile 
The district contains the wide swath between the Tehachapi Mountains to the north and the San Gabriel Mountains to the south. The district is dominated by the Antelope Valley and forms the western edge of the High Desert and the Mojave Desert in general. Most of Edwards Air Force Base is contained in the district.

Kern County – 5.2%
 California City
 Mojave
 Rosamond

Los Angeles County – 4.1%
 Acton
 Lancaster
 Littlerock
 Palmdale
 Quartz Hill
 Parts of northern Santa Clarita

San Bernardino County – 0.9%
 Phelan – partial
 Piñon Hills
 Wrightwood

Election results from statewide races

List of Assembly Members 
Due to redistricting, the 36th district has been moved around different parts of the state. The current iteration resulted from the 2011 redistricting by the California Citizens Redistricting Commission.

Election results 1992 - present

2020

2018

2016

2014

2012

2010

2008

2006

2004

2002

2000

1998

1996

1994

1992

See also 
 California State Assembly
 California State Assembly districts
 Districts in California

References

External links 
 District map from the California Citizens Redistricting Commission

36
Government of Kern County, California
Government of Los Angeles County, California
Government of San Bernardino County, California
Antelope Valley
Mojave Desert

Lancaster, California
Mojave, California
Palmdale, California
Rosamond, California
Wrightwood, California